The Jefferson County Courthouse is a historic building in Charles Town, West Virginia, USA. The building is historically notable as the site of two trials for treason: that of John Brown in 1859 (treason against Virginia), and those of unionizing coal miners from Mingo County, West Virginia (treason against West Virginia), a consequence of the Battle of Blair Mountain, whose trials were moved from the southern part of the state in 1922 as a result of a change of venue.

Description
The courthouse is a red brick building in the Georgian style with a prominent Doric pedimented porch. It has an unusual clock tower with a square dome that resembles Second Empire structures. The courthouse is set on a high stone foundation, facing onto a small yard enclosed by a metal fence. The porch has four Doric columns, with small copies of the portico's pediment over the main floor windows and front door, and a projecting central iron balcony on the upper level. The first Mullett addition largely matches the main building, while the second addition features significant stone trim detailing.

History

The first courthouse on the site was built in 1803 on a lot donated by Charles Washington, but was destroyed in a fire. Its replacement, the core of the present courthouse, was built in 1836–37 with its present Doric pedimented porch. During the American Civil War the courthouse was heavily damaged by cannon fire and was salvaged for metal. Was it torn down? From 1865 to 1872 the courthouse was vacant, and court was held in Shepherdstown at McMurran Hall. In 1871–72 the building was reconstructed to a design by Phillips and Cockrill, keeping the façade, but little else. A disproportionately large cupola was added for the town clock on top of the porch at this time. In 1910 Alfred B. Mullett designed an extension to the rear, with a later Georgian Revival addition comprising a jail and sheriff's offices.

Two famous trials have taken place in the courthouse. The first was Virginia v. John Brown, John Brown's 1859 trial for treason against Virginia, fomenting a slave insurrection, and murder. Brown's captured associates, facing the same charges, were tried at the same time. All were found guilty and executed. The second was the  trial of coal miners from Mingo County who had fought in the Battle of Blair Mountain, whose trial had changed venue to Jefferson County. The trials eventually moved to Morgan County, and then Greenbrier County.

A former plaque at the entrance to the courthouse "in honor and memory of the Confederate soldiers of Jefferson County", placed in 1986 by the United Daughters of the Confederacy, was removed in 2018, as part of the wave of removal of Confederate monuments and memorials that followed Dylann Roof's massacre.

References

External links

Law Librarians of Congress feature on the Jefferson County Courthouse

Courthouses on the National Register of Historic Places in West Virginia
Buildings and structures in Charles Town, West Virginia
Georgian architecture in West Virginia
County courthouses in West Virginia
Tourist attractions in Jefferson County, West Virginia
Clock towers in West Virginia
National Register of Historic Places in Jefferson County, West Virginia
Government buildings completed in 1808
Government buildings completed in 1836
Historic American Buildings Survey in West Virginia
John Brown's raid on Harpers Ferry
United Daughters of the Confederacy monuments and memorials
Alfred B. Mullett buildings